James Baxter Hunt Jr. (born May 16, 1937) is an American politician and retired attorney who was the 69th and 71st Governor of North Carolina (1977–1985, and 1993–2001). He is the longest-serving governor in the state's history.

Hunt is tied with former Ohio governor Jim Rhodes for the sixth-longest gubernatorial tenure in post-Constitutional U.S. history at  days.

Early life
Hunt was born on May 16, 1937, in Greensboro, North Carolina to James Baxtor Hunt, a soil conservationist, and Elsie Brame Hunt, a schoolteacher. When he was a child, the family moved to a farm outside of Wilson, North Carolina. He was raised in the Free Will Baptist Church but later converted to Presbyterianism.

He is a graduate of North Carolina State College, now known as North Carolina State University, with a B.S. in agricultural education and a M.S.  in agricultural economics. During his undergraduate career, Hunt was involved in Student Government. He was the second student to serve two terms as Student Body President of NC State. His master's thesis was about economic analysis of different tobacco production techniques. In 1964, he received a J.D. from the University of North Carolina School of Law. He went on to serve as the President of the Young Democratic Clubs of North Carolina, now known as the Young Democrats of North Carolina.

Political career

From 1964 to 1966, Hunt was a Ford Foundation economic advisor in Nepal. After working on several state and national campaigns for Democratic candidates and attending several Democratic conventions as a delegate, in addition to his work with the North Carolina Young Democratic Clubs, in 1972 he ran successfully for lieutenant governor. He was sworn-in on January 5, 1973. With the election of James Holshouser as governor in 1972—the first Republican to win the office in decades—the Democratic majority in the General Assembly was compelled to raise the stature of the office of the lieutenant governor. It raised the job's salary from $5,000 to $30,000 per year, increased the office operating budget, and expanded its staff from two to five.

Hunt was first sworn in as Governor of North Carolina on January 8, 1977. He is the only Governor of North Carolina to have been elected to four terms. He was first elected Governor in 1976 over Republican David Flaherty and was re-elected in 1980, defeating I. Beverly Lake.  Hunt supported a constitutional change during his first term that allowed him to be the first North Carolina governor to run for a second consecutive term.

Hunt Commission
In 1981 Hunt chaired the Hunt Commission, named after himself, which established superdelegates in the Democratic National Convention.

U.S. Senate Run
In 1984 he lost a bitterly contested race for the Senate seat held by Jesse Helms, and left elective politics for several years. He returned in 1992 and defeated Republican Lt. Governor and Hardee's executive Jim Gardner to win the Governorship. Hunt was re-elected by a large margin over future US Congressman Robin Hayes in 1996. He left office in January 2001, and was replaced by fellow Democrat, Attorney General Mike Easley.

Actions and political views

In the 1970s Governor Hunt was a supporter of the Equal Rights Amendment and, with his wife Carolyn, he urged its approval by the state legislature (which failed to ratify it by two votes) and appointed Betty Ray McCain as his chief lobbyist for the amendment. Hunt was an early proponent of teaching standards and early childhood education, gaining national recognition for the Smart Start program for pre-kindergarteners. In his book, First in America: An education governor challenges North Carolina, Hunt says that under testing and accountability measures he put into place test scores went up.  He says 56% of students were proficient in 1994 compared with 70% in the year 2000. He says without testing students slip through the cracks and face a "limited future" (p. 55). In 2000 he was mentioned as a possible Democratic nominee for Vice President of the United States or Education Secretary for Al Gore had Gore been successful in the 2000 presidential race. 2004 Democratic nominee Sen. John Kerry was likewise considering Hunt for Secretary of Education had he won, and he was considered a candidate to be Barack Obama's Secretary of Education.

Hunt served on the Carnegie Task Force, which created the National Board for Professional Teaching Standards and more recently on the Spellings Commission on the Future of Higher Education.

As governor, Hunt was involved in a variety of efforts to promote technology and technology-based economic development, including the establishment of the North Carolina Biotechnology Center, and the North Carolina School of Science and Mathematics. He was also very successful at recruiting business to his state.

Hunt was key actor in the trial of the Wilmington Ten. By the late 1970s, their case had gained international attention and was viewed as an embarrassment to the US and North Carolina in particular. CBS had broadcast a 60 Minute piece about the case that suggested that the evidence against the ten had been fabricated. In January 1978, following the higher courts' refusal to dismiss these charges, Hunt decided to reduce their sentencing of 20–25 years to 13–17 years rather than pardon and free them.  Many black North Carolinian politicians at the time disapproved of Hunt's decision but the general mentality at the time was that "right now blacks have nowhere else to turn" so there was no organized opposition movement. Howard Nathaniel Lee, however, refused to resign from his appointed role as cabinet secretary, as a form of protest against Hunt.

Hunt was criticized for allowing Darryl Hunt (no relation known) to remain in prison for twenty years after the wrongfully convicted Winston-Salem man was exonerated by exculpatory DNA evidence which pointed to another perpetrator. Darryl Hunt was pardoned by the succeeding Governor, Mike Easley. During his terms in office Hunt oversaw 13 executions (two during his first period in office, 11 during his second), including the first post-Furman execution of a female (Velma Barfield) and the first post-Furman execution in North Carolina (James W. Hutchins).

Hunt was a proponent of North Carolina's tobacco industry, even after the negative health effects of tobacco use became clear. When Reagan Administration Surgeon General Dr. C. Everett Koop accused the tobacco industry of directing advertising at children and threatening human lives, Hunt called for his impeachment.

Retirement
Hunt founded and is chair emeritus of the Institute for Emerging Issues at N.C. State University in Raleigh. In 2001 Hunt founded the James B. Hunt, Jr. Institute for Educational Leadership & Policy Foundation, Inc., commonly known as The Hunt Institute. The organization's mission is to secure America's future through quality education, and is dedicated to empowering governors, policymakers, and other educational leaders in the development and implementation of comprehensive strategies for the transformation of public education.

Electoral history

1976 gubernatorial election

Hunt won a first term, defeating David Flaherty 64.99% to 33.90%.

1980 gubernatorial election

Hunt won a second term, defeating I. Beverly Lake Jr. 61.88% to 37.43%.

1984 senatorial election

Hunt lost a Senate race to incumbent Jesse Helms, who won 51.7%	to 47.8%. This is the only statewide election Hunt ever lost.

1992 gubernatorial election

Hunt won a non-consecutive third term, defeating Lieutenant Governor Jim Gardner 52.72% to 43.23%.

1996 gubernatorial election 

Hunt won a fourth term, defeating Robert C. Hayes 55.98% to 42.75%.

Legacy
 The following are named for Governor Hunt:
James B. Hunt, Jr. Institute for Educational Leadership & Policy Foundation, Inc.
James B. Hunt, Jr. Library at North Carolina State University Centennial Campus
James B. Hunt High School in Wilson County, North Carolina
James B. Hunt Jr. Residence Hall at North Carolina School of Science and Mathematics
James B. Hunt Horse Complex at the North Carolina State Fairgrounds is used year-round for horse shows and other agricultural exhibitions.
 The M/V Gov. James B. Hunt Jr. is the primary ferry on the Currituck Sound route, making daily runs between Currituck and Knotts Island, operated by the North Carolina Department of Transportation Ferry Division
Hunt Hall (dormitory) at the University of North Carolina at Charlotte
 An authorized biography of Hunt, authored by former press secretary Gary Pearce, was released in the fall of 2010.

See also
List of North Carolina Governors

References

Works cited

Further reading
 Grimsley, Wayne. James B. Hunt: A North Carolina Progressive (2003) scholarly biography

External links
 News & Observer profile
 Womble Carlyle Sandridge & Rice, PLLC Biography
UNC-TV: Biographical Conversations with James B. Hunt, Jr.
Guide to the James B. Hunt Papers 1971-1997, 2012
Past Winners of Harold W. McGraw, Jr. Prize in Education
 James B. Hunt Political Campaign Audiovisual Material, 1980–1997
 

|-

|-

|-

|-

|-

|-

|-

|-

1937 births
Living people
20th-century American lawyers
20th-century American politicians
American Presbyterians
American expatriates in Nepal
Candidates in the 1984 United States elections
Converts to Presbyterianism
Democratic Party governors of North Carolina
Former Baptists
Jim
Lieutenant Governors of North Carolina
North Carolina State University alumni
People from Wilson, North Carolina